Iuka Township is located in Marion County, Illinois. As of the 2010 census, its population was 999 and it contained 443 housing units.

Geography 

Iuka Township (T2N R4E) is centered at 38°38'N 88°45'W (38.636,-88.758). It is traversed east–west by U.S. Route 50.

Demographics

Adjacent townships 
 Omega Township (north)
 Songer Township, Clay County (northeast)
 Hickory Hill Township, Wayne County (northeast)
 Garden Hill Township, Wayne County (east)
 Orchard Township, Wayne County (southeast)
 Romine Township (south)
 Haines Township (southwest)
 Stevenson Township (west)
 Alma Township (northwest)

References

External links
US Census
City-data.com
Illinois State Archives

Townships in Marion County, Illinois
Townships in Illinois